Corinna Lin (born October 26, 1994) is a Taiwanese-American figure skater who competes internationally for Taiwan in ladies singles. She is the 2011 Taiwanese National Champion.

Personal background 
Lin attended Pearl River High School in Rockland, New York. Aside from skating, Lin is an honors student and a first degree taekwondo black belt. She speaks fluent Mandarin Chinese and hopes to become a doctor.

Skating background 
Lin won the gold medal at the 2011 Chinese Taipei Figure Skating Championships in Taipei, Taiwan at the age of 16.

Skate for Love 
Lin, with the help of Madison Olivieri, created Skate for Love, a figure skating cause for cancer research. The proceeds went on to help the Susan G. Komen for the Cure charity.

Competitive highlights

References 

1994 births
Living people
Taiwanese female single skaters
American sportspeople of Taiwanese descent
American sportswomen of Chinese descent
21st-century American women